The canton of Thourotte is an administrative division of the Oise department, northern France. It was created at the French canton reorganisation which came into effect in March 2015. Its seat is in Thourotte.

It consists of the following communes:
 
Amy
Avricourt
Bailly
Beaulieu-les-Fontaines
Cambronne-lès-Ribécourt
Candor
Cannectancourt
Canny-sur-Matz
Chevincourt
Chiry-Ourscamp
Crapeaumesnil
Cuy
Dives
Écuvilly
Élincourt-Sainte-Marguerite
Évricourt
Fresnières
Gury
Laberlière
Lagny
Lassigny
Longueil-Annel
Machemont
Marest-sur-Matz
Mareuil-la-Motte
Margny-aux-Cerises
Mélicocq
Montmacq
Ognolles
Pimprez
Plessis-de-Roye
Le Plessis-Brion
Ribécourt-Dreslincourt
Roye-sur-Matz
Saint-Léger-aux-Bois
Solente
Thiescourt
Thourotte
Tracy-le-Val
Vandélicourt

References

Cantons of Oise